Joseph Édouard de La Motte-Rouge' was a French general and politician.

Biography

Motte-Rouge was trained at the Saint-Cyr military school from 1819 to 1821, he was assigned to the Spanish expedition as a second lieutenant in the 22nd line infantry battalion. He witnessed the battles of Corunna and San Sebastián, and was part of the occupying forces in the division of Madrid until 1825.

In 1830, during the Belgian Revolution, he was assigned to the Army of the North of Marshal Gerard and takes part in the fighting against the United Kingdom of the Netherlands, which end with the taking of Antwerp (December 1832): he was promoted to captain.

On 15 July 1848, he was appointed colonel of the 19th Light Infantry regiment. After various assignments in the North of France, he was appointed brigadier general after the coup d'état of 1851 . Assigned to Varna during the Crimean War (1853), he took part in the Battle of Alma, he even distinguished himself at the Battle of Inkerman. Promoted to Division General in June 1855. He received the command of the 2nd Division of the Army of the East , was twice wounded in a general assault that ends the Battle of the Chernaya.

After being commander of the 15th Military Division in Nantes, he would later be commanding the 1st  Division 2nd Army Corps of Patrice de MacMahon at the beginning of the Second Italian War of Independence. Its division fought in the battles of Turbigo and Magenta, and played a decisive role in the Battle of Solferino. Retired in 1869, he was elected the same year as the official candidate of Napoleon III in the legislative body in the  st  district of the North Coast.

However, after the debacle at Sedan, the Government of National Defense reinstatement in the army cadres and soon given command of the 15th parked Corps at Nantes, the first nucleus of the Army of the Loire. The government ordered him to march on Orleans , which he reached onOctober 6, 1870, but his troops are beaten at Artenay by the corps of the Bavarian general von der Thann. La Motte-Rouge had to evacuate Orléans on October 11 but he was immediately dismissed and replaced by General Louis d'Aurelle de Paladines.

Family

The La Motte de La Motte-Rouge family comes from Hénansal , in what is now Côtes-d'Armor.

Joseph-Édouard is the son of Joseph-Marie de La Motte de La Motte-Rouge (1770-1848), battalion commander in the Guard of kings Louis XVIII and Charles X , knight of the Legion of Honor, and Agathe -Julie de La Motte de La Guyomarais, (1771-1833).

He married Clémentine Pocquet de Livonnière (1812-1900) on 18 October 1840 and he remained without a descendant. But his nephews are at the origin of many posterity.

Awards
Legion of Honor (Grand Officer on 17 June 1859, Grand Cross on 11 October 1873)

Foreign Awards
: Order of Saints Maurice and Lazarus
: Order of the Medjidie
: Order of St. Stanislaus
: Order of the Bath

References

Bibliography
 ;
 Henri de La Messelière, Filiations bretonnes, Saint-Brieuc, éditions Prudhomme, 1922, Tome IV; pages 125-132.

1804 births
1883 deaths
French military officers
French people of the Franco-Prussian War
Commandeurs of the Légion d'honneur
French generals
French military personnel of the Franco-Prussian War
French military personnel of the Second French intervention in Mexico
People of the Second Italian War of Independence
People of the Belgian Revolution
French military personnel of the Crimean War